The fourth HMS Torrington (K577) was a British Captain-class frigate of the Royal Navy in commission during World War II. Originally constructed as a United States Navy Buckley class destroyer escort, she served in the Royal Navy from 1944 to 1946.

Construction and transfer
The ship was laid down as the unnamed U.S. Navy destroyer escort DE-568 by Bethlehem-Hingham Shipyard, Inc., in Hingham, Massachusetts, on 22 September 1943 and launched on 27 November 1943. She was transferred to the United Kingdom upon completion on 18 January 1944.

Service history

The ship was commissioned into service in the Royal Navy  as the frigate HMS Torrington (K577) on 18 January 1944 simultaneously with her transfer. After shakedown in Casco Bay, Maine, and off Bermuda, she steamed to St. John's and Naval Station Argentia in the Dominion of Newfoundland before proceeding to England. Arriving there on 20 April 1944, she began patrol and escort duty in the English Channel, North Sea, and North Atlantic Ocean.

On 21 July 1944, Torrington saw her first combat, joining the escort destroyer  in action against a German destroyer and four German S-boat – known to the Allies as "E-boat" – motor torpedo boats off Cap d'Antifer, France, preventing them from interfering with the flow of Allied supplies supporting the invasion of Normandy. On 11 March 1945, she sank a German Seehund ("Seal") Type XXVII midget submarine off Ramsgate, England. On 13 March 1945, she sank a second Seehund off Dunkirk, France, in a determined depth charge attack.

The Royal Navy returned Torrington to the U.S. Navy on 11 June 1946.

Disposal
The U.S. Navy struck Torrington from its Naval Vessel Register on 15 October 1946. She was sold on 26 September 1947 for scrapping.

References

Navsource Online: Destroyer Escort Photo Archive Torrington (DE-568) HMS Torrington (K-577)
uboat.net HMS Torrington (K 577)
Destroyer Escort Sailors Association DEs for UK
Captain Class Frigate Association HMS Torrington K577 (DE 568)

External links
Photo gallery of HMS Torrington (K577)

 

Captain-class frigates
Buckley-class destroyer escorts
World War II frigates of the United Kingdom
Ships built in Hingham, Massachusetts
1943 ships